Orthospila plutusalis is a moth in the family Crambidae. It was described by Francis Walker in 1859. It is found in mainland India, as well as on the Andamans.

References

Moths described in 1859
Spilomelinae
Moths of Asia